This is a list of presidents of Nigeria by age.

Overview
The youngest person to become head of state was Yakubu Gowon, who at the age of 31, assumed office after the assassination of Johnson Aguiyi-Ironsi during the July 1966 counter-coup. The youngest civilian president to assume the presidency was Goodluck Jonathan, who at the age of 52, succeeded to the office after the death of Umaru Musa Yar'Adua, he was also the youngest person elected to the office at the age of 53. The youngest to become president by election was Shehu Shagari, who was inaugurated at age 54. The oldest person to assume the presidency was Muhammadu Buhari, the nation's current president, who was inaugurated at age 72.

Assassinated at age 37, Murtala Muhammed was the youngest head of state at the end of his tenure, and his lifespan was the shortest of any head of state, he was the only head of state not to have lived to the age of 40. At age 40, Yakubu Gowon was the youngest person to become a former head of state. The oldest president at the end of his tenure was Olusegun Obasanjo at 70; this distinction will eventually fall upon Muhammadu Buhari, who is currently . Buhari was born before three of his predecessors, Sani Abacha, Umaru Musa Yar'Adua, (both of whom are dead) and Goodluck Jonathan.

Goodluck Jonathan's retirement, now  years, is currently the shortest, Yakubu Gowon's retirement, now  years, is the longest in Nigeria's history. At age , Gowon is also the oldest living head of state. Shehu Shagari who died in 2018 aged 93 is the nation's longest-lived president. Only two presidents (Shehu Shagari and Nnamdi Azikiwe) have lived into their 90s. The youngest living president is Goodluck Jonathan, age .

List of presidents by age at assuming office
This is a list of presidents of Nigeria by age at assuming office from the youngest to the oldest.

List of presidents by longevity
This table shows presidents by their longevity (living presidents in gold).

Nigerian heads of state's ages
This table charts the age of each head of state of Nigeria at the time of assuming office, upon leaving office, and at the time of death.

Notes

References

Lists of Nigerian politicians
Nigeria, Presidents